miRTarBase  is a curated database of MicroRNA-Target Interactions. As a database, miRTarBase has accumulated more than fifty thousand miRNA-target interactions (MTIs), which are collected by manually surveying pertinent literature after data mining of the text systematically to filter research articles related to functional studies of miRNAs. Generally, the collected MTIs are validated experimentally by reporter assay, western blot, microarray and next-generation sequencing experiments. While containing the largest amount of validated MTIs, the miRTarBase provides the most updated collection by comparing with other similar, previously developed databases.

See also
 MicroRNAs

References

External links
 miRTarBase database

Biological databases
RNA
MicroRNA